Roy Hopkins may refer to:

 Roy M. Hopkins (1943–2006), member of the Louisiana House of Representatives
 Roy Hopkins (American football) (1945–1996), American football player